Chalermpong Kerdkaew (born 7 October 1986), simply known as Ball, is a Thai professional footballer who plays as a centre-back for Thai League 1 club Chonburi and the Thailand national team.

International career
Chalermpong played in the third round of 2018 FIFA World Cup qualification and the 2018 AFF Suzuki Cup.

Personal life
His younger brother, Noppon Kerdkaew, is also a footballer for Nakhon Ratchasima.

Honours

International
Thailand
 King's Cup (1): 2017

Club
Buriram United (PEA FC)
 Thai Premier League (1): 2008
 Thai FA Cup (1): 2012
 Thai League Cup (1): 2012

Buriram
 Regional League Division 2 (1): 2010
 Thai Division 1 League (1): 2011

Individual
Thai League 1 Best XI: 2020–21

References

External links

1986 births
Living people
Chalermpong Kerdkaew
Chalermpong Kerdkaew
Association football defenders
Chalermpong Kerdkaew
Chalermpong Kerdkaew
Chalermpong Kerdkaew
Chalermpong Kerdkaew
Chalermpong Kerdkaew
Chalermpong Kerdkaew
Chalermpong Kerdkaew
2019 AFC Asian Cup players
Chalermpong Kerdkaew